Boggild or Bøggild may refer to:

Mogens Bøggild (1901-1987), Danish sculptor
Valdemar Bøggild (1893-1943), Danish gymnast
Ove Balthasar Bøggild (1872-1956), Danish mineralogist
C.O. Bøggild-Andersen (1898-1967), Danish historian
O.B. Bøggild Fjord, a fjord in North Greenland